The 1972 King's Cup finals were held from November 18 to November 28, 1972, once again in Bangkok. This was the 5th edition of the international football competition. South Korea were set to defend the title they won in 1969, 1970 and 1971

The tournaments schedule was changed from previous editions and only featured one group with 5 teams. The winners and runners up entered a final.

Fixtures and results

Group stage

Indonesia played with a 'B' representative side.

3rd Place Match

3rd place shared

Final

Winner

External links
RSSSF

King's Cup
Kings Cup, 1972
Kings Cup, 1972
International association football competitions hosted by Thailand